Lidia Gertrudis Sogandares (1908-1971), was an Panaman physician. 

She became the first indigenous female physician in Panama in 1934.

References

1908 births
1971 deaths
Panamanian physicians
20th-century Panamanian women